Hsp104 is a heat-shock protein. It is known to reverse toxicity of mutant α-synuclein, TDP-43, FUS, and TAF15 in yeast cells.

References

Heat shock proteins